Taveh Espid (also Romanized as Ţāveh Espīd; also known as Tāveh Safīd and Tāveh Sefīd) is a village in Sarfaryab Rural District, Sarfaryab District, Charam County, Kohgiluyeh and Boyer-Ahmad Province, Iran. At the 2006 census, its population was 115, in 27 families.

References 

Populated places in Charam County